Kiyosue may refer to:

, domain of Japan
 (1514–1553), Japanese daimyō

Japanese masculine given names